A Tribute to Fats Waller is a solo album by pianist Jay McShann that was recorded in 1978 and first released by the Canadian Sackville label as an LP before being reissued on the compilation CD Solos & Duets.

Reception

AllMusic's Scott Yanow noted "Jay McShann does not sound at all like Fats Waller, but he is effective during this set of unaccompanied piano solos (no vocals) in bringing back to life nine of Waller's tunes, in his own way. A more blues-based improviser than Waller, with a sparser left hand (swing rather than stride), McShann is in spirited form".

Track listing
 "Honeysuckle Rose" (Fats Waller, Andy Razaf) – 4:55
 "Keepin' Out Of Mischief Now" (Waller, Razaf) – 3:58
 "Then I'll Be Tired of You" (Arthur Schwartz, Yip Harburg) – 4:30
 "Ain't Misbehavin'" (Waller, Razaf, Harry Brooks) – 5:15
 "All My Life" (Sam H. Stept, Sidney D. Mitchell) – 5:07
 "I'm Gonna Sit Right Down and Write Myself a Letter" (Fred E. Ahlert, Joe Young) – 5:27
 "I Ain't Got Nobody" (Spencer Williams, Roger A. Graham) – 3:58
 "Squeeze Me" (Waller, Clarence Wiliams) – 4:55
 "Lulu's Back In Town" (Harry Warren, Al Dubin) – 3:55

Personnel
Jay McShann – piano

References

Jay McShann albums
1978 albums
Sackville Records albums
Fats Waller tribute albums